Daniel Marcelo Fernández Tocci (born 7 March 1963) is a former Argentine professional football midfielder. After retiring as a player he coached teams in El Salvador.

Coaching career

Atlético Marte 
In February 2015, Fernández signed as new coach of Atlético Marte, replacing Gabriel Álvarez. In June 2015, Fernández was replaced by Carlos Antonio Meléndez.

Alianza 
In February 2016, Fernández signed as new coach of Alianza for the rest of the Clausura 2016 tournament, replacing Rubén Alonso. In August 2016, Fernández was replaced by Milton Meléndez.

References

External links
 Daniel Fernández at Soccerway 

1963 births
Living people
Argentine footballers
Argentine football managers
Expatriate football managers in El Salvador
Atletico Marte managers

Association football midfielders